Coccothrinax garciana is a palm which is endemic to Holguín Province, Cuba.

Henderson and colleagues (1995) considered C. garciana to be a synonym of Coccothrinax pauciramosa.

References

garciana
Trees of Cuba
Plants described in 1939